Phuleswari, also known as Pramateswari Devi, was the chief consort of an Ahom king Siva Singha of Ahom kingdom of what is now Assam who ruled the kingdom from 1722 to 1731 A.D. She was the first queen of Ahom kingdom to govern the kingdom directly. She was originally a dancer in a religious temple dedicated to the Hindu God Shiva. When the king saw her, he was captivated by her beauty and decided to marry her and made her his chief consort. Phuleswari after having assumed the title of Bor Raja, coins were minted on her, alongside her husband.

Bar raja

Birth 
Phuleshwari earlier known as Phulmati, and was born in the Kalugaon Gayan Gaon in Sivasagar district. Phuleshwari original name was Phulmati. She was born in the Nat caste, a caste of dancers.

Reign 
 
Captivated by her beauty the king married her and made her the chief consort and name. She was made the Bor Raja by Siva Singha after having declared chatra-bhanga-yoga which means the end of his reign by astrologers, in other to avert this he made Phuleswari the chief regent and gave the title of Bor Raja (Great king), and gave the name of Pramateswari, a name of Goddess Durga. Phuleshwari actually took the reins of government to her hands and ''meddled too much on the matter of region and customs, Phuleshwari was more under the influence of the Brahmanas, particularly the Parvatiya Gosain, she attempted to make Saktism the state religion. To execute her plan, she summoned the Shudra Mahantas to the Durga Puja held in Sakta shrine and compelled them to bow their heads before the goddess, have their forehead besmeared with the blood of sacrificed animal and made them accept nirmali and prasad. The Mahantas considered it as a grave insult not to be forgiven, he decided to take vengeance at an opportune moment, which later caused a key factor for the Moamoria rebellion.
And in her consuming zeal of a neophyte for Sakti Hinduism, she declared Shaktism as the state's official religion.

Death 
Queen Phuleswari remained in the position of Bar Raja from 1722 till her death in the year 1731. She was given a Maidam against her own will by Siva Singha according to Ahom rites.

Civil works 
Phuleshwari was a  great patron of Sanskrit, had started a Sanskrit school within the campus and art and culture. She made her younger brother Harinath first Borgohain and then Borpatra Gohain, and posted many of her relative into high offices. Her brother Harinath Borpatragohain had excavated the Lakshmi Sagar, and constructed temples  on its bank. Her uncle Joyananda was made the Dhekial Barua, and three other of her relatives are made  the Khanikar Barua, Chaudang Barua and Devi Ghar barua.
 Phuleshwari had excavated the Gaurisagar tank, and had constructed three temples dedicated to Shiva, Devi and, Vishnu.

References

Citations

 
 
 
 

Year of birth missing
1731 deaths
History of India
History of Assam
Ahom kingdom
Hindu monarchs